Yulian  Aleksandrovich Panich (born 23 May 1931, Zinovyevsk) is a Soviet / Russian actor, director, and journalist. Honored Artist of Russia (1996).

Biography

After graduating from the Shchukin Acting School in Moscow in 1954, Panich had a successful career of a Soviet film actor. In 1965 began working as a television and film director.

In 1972, Yulian Panich left the Soviet Union for Israel.  Later that year he was offered a job in Munich with the Radio Liberty/Free Europe radio. Soon Panich became chief program producer with the Russian service (Radio Svoboda) and the symbol of anti-Soviet resistance. As such he was the object of special interest by the KGB.

After his retirement in 1995, Yulian Panich had been living in the suburbs of Paris - Rambouillet.

Family 
Yulian Panich is married to Ludmila Zweig since 1956. They have a son, Igor Panich (born 1958) who is a writer.

Filmography 
 Road to Life (1955) as Semyon
  For the Power of the Soviets (1956) as Svyatoslav Marchenko
Bloody Dawn (1956) as Marco Hushcha
 Different Fates (1956) as Fedor Morozov
 Three Hundred Years Ago ... (1956)  as Tymofiy Khmelnytsky
 Total Expensive (1957) as Roman Baklanov
Leningrad Symphony (1957) as episode 
 Stepan Kolchugin (1958) as Kuzma
 Kochubey  (1958) as  Sashko Nalivayko
   About my Friend (1958) as  Aram
 Carefully, Grandma! (1960) as Vasya Kazatchkov
   Reflections (1960) as episode
 Novels Red House (1963) as Maxim Sivoshapko
 Green Coach (1967) as Prince Vasili
 Pervorossiyane (1968) as Ataman Shurakov
Seeing the White Nights (1969) as director

References

External links

   Юлиан Панич. На театрах. Актёрская исповедь

1931 births
Living people
Soviet male actors
People from Kropyvnytskyi
Soviet dissidents
Radio and television announcers
Soviet emigrants to Germany
Soviet emigrants to France